Choi Dae-Shik (born January 10, 1965) is a former South Korean football player. He played for Daewoo Royals (South Korea), LG Cheetahs (South Korea) and Oita Trinita (Japan). He was a participant at 1994 FIFA World Cup and 1994 Asian Games.

He is now manager of Kyungmin Information Industrial Technology High School football team.

Club statistics

National team statistics

Honours

Player
Lucky-Goldstar Hwangso 
 K League Winners (1) : 1990

Individual
K League Top Assists Award : 1990

External links
 
 
 

1965 births
Living people
Association football forwards
South Korean footballers
South Korean expatriate footballers
South Korea international footballers
Busan IPark players
FC Seoul players
Oita Trinita players
K League 1 players
J2 League players
Japan Football League (1992–1998) players
1994 FIFA World Cup players
Expatriate footballers in Japan
South Korean expatriate sportspeople in Japan
Korea University alumni
Footballers at the 1994 Asian Games
Asian Games competitors for South Korea